Turmik is a valley in the Karakorum mountain ranges in the Skardu District of Gilgit-Baltistan, Pakistan. The valley has its source at the Stak-la and Basha valley lies to its east and Stak Valley to its west.

The valley is the second largest valley in term of population and area, Stak Valley being the first, in the Roundu Subdivision.

References 

Populated places in Skardu District
Valleys of Gilgit-Baltistan